Northpark is an eastern suburb of the city of Auckland, New Zealand. Most of the houses were built in the 1990s. Before 1990, the area was rural.

Demographics

Northpark had a population of 5,094 at the 2018 New Zealand census, an increase of 114 people (2.3%) since the 2013 census, and an increase of 27 people (0.5%) since the 2006 census. There were 1,653 households, comprising 2,499 males and 2,595 females, giving a sex ratio of 0.96 males per female, with 903 people (17.7%) aged under 15 years, 951 (18.7%) aged 15 to 29, 2,421 (47.5%) aged 30 to 64, and 816 (16.0%) aged 65 or older.

Ethnicities were 45.8% European/Pākehā, 3.5% Māori, 2.1% Pacific peoples, 49.9% Asian, and 4.5% other ethnicities. People may identify with more than one ethnicity.

The percentage of people born overseas was 56.6, compared with 27.1% nationally.

Although some people chose not to answer the census's question about religious affiliation, 45.2% had no religion, 36.0% were Christian, 0.2% had Māori religious beliefs, 3.7% were Hindu, 1.9% were Muslim, 3.8% were Buddhist and 3.5% had other religions.

Of those at least 15 years old, 1,356 (32.4%) people had a bachelor's or higher degree, and 453 (10.8%) people had no formal qualifications. 873 people (20.8%) earned over $70,000 compared to 17.2% nationally. The employment status of those at least 15 was that 2,106 (50.3%) people were employed full-time, 516 (12.3%) were part-time, and 129 (3.1%) were unemployed.

Education

References

Suburbs of Auckland
Howick Local Board Area